Maria Medina (born 15 July 1948) represented Puerto Rico at the 1976 Summer Olympic Games in archery.

Olympics 

Medina competed in the women's individual event and finished 27th with a score of 1993 points.

References

External links 

 Profile on worldarchery.org

1948 births
Living people
Puerto Rican female archers
Olympic archers of Puerto Rico
Archers at the 1976 Summer Olympics